

Cleland is a suburb in South Australia located in the Adelaide metropolitan area about  south-east of the Adelaide city centre.  Its boundaries were created in October 2001, with additional land being added in 2010 from the adjoining suburb of Crafers.  Its name is derived from the former Cleland Conservation Park (since November 2021 a national park known as Cleland National Park). 

The principal land use within the locality is conservation with the majority of its land area being occupied by the Cleland National Park. Places within its extent include the summit of Mount Lofty. Cleland is located within the federal Division of Mayo, the state electoral district of Bragg and the local government areas of the Adelaide Hills Council  and the City of Burnside.

See also
Cleland (disambiguation)

References

Suburbs of Adelaide